Kevin Sinnott (born 1947, Wales) is a Welsh painter known contemporary depictions of Welsh life.

Biography 
Sinnott was born in Sarn, South Wales to Irish parents. One of his best known paintings is "Running Away With the Hairdresser" (1995), which is housed in the collection of the National Museum of Wales in Cardiff.

Sinnott studied at Cardiff College of Art and Design from 1967 to 1968, then Gloucester College of Art & Design from 1968 to 1971 and finally; the Royal College of Art in London from 1971 to 1974. During the 1970s and 1980s he exhibited at London galleries including Anne Berthoud and Martin Tinney.

Sinnott has also exhibited internationally at Jan Turner Gallery, Los Angeles, Roger Ramsey Gallery, Chicago and Bernard Jacobson, New York. Following on from these exhibitions Sinnott's work was acquired by major collections including the Metropolitan Museum of Art, New York, the Arts Council of Great Britain, the Royal College of Art, London and the British Museum, as well as, private and corporate collections worldwide.

Sinnott returned to Wales in 1995, where he now lives and works.

Bibliography 
 Kevin Sinnott, Behind the Canvas [Published by Seren Books, 2008] Wales

Interviews 
 Kevin Sinnott & Running Away with the Hairdresser [Framing Wales: Art in the 20th Century, BBC Two, 2011]

References 

1947 births
Living people
Welsh people of Irish descent
Alumni of Cardiff School of Art and Design
21st-century Welsh painters
21st-century Welsh male artists
21st-century male artists
Alumni of the Royal College of Art
Welsh male painters